The Atherley School was an independent girls' school based in Southampton, Hampshire, England, from 1926 - 2006 until it merged with Embley Park school to become Hampshire Collegiate School.

History of the school

In 1926 the Atherley was opened in Hill Lane, next to King Edward VI school. It was named after the two Atherley sisters who donated the land to the school. At that time there were 26 girls and one boy.

During World War II the school evacuated to Winchester where it used classrooms in Winchester College in the mornings and St. Swithuns in the afternoon.

In 1997 the Atherley moved to Grove Place in Nursling where it took over Northcliffe School. Grove Place Prep school was also started. The school was officially opened by Princess Anne. The junior school had moved to the Nursling site a year or two before the senior school joined it and the Hill Lane campus was demolished.

In 2004, after 76 years, it was announced that the Atherley and Embley Park schools were to undergo a merger. The Atherley closed in 2006.

Houses 
The senior school houses were named after famous women, namely Austen (blue), Johnson (yellow), Nightingale (green) and Curie (red). The junior school houses were named after woodland trees, Oak (red), Lime (green) and  Beech (blue). Prior to this division in the houses (around 1989), both the junior and senior schools were grouped into six houses named after European rivers - Garonne, Danube, Ebro, Rhine, Shannon and Tiber.

Educational institutions established in 1926
Educational institutions disestablished in 2006
Defunct schools in Hampshire
1926 establishments in England
2006 disestablishments in England